"Equinoxe Infinity" is the twentieth studio album by French musician and composer Jean-Michel Jarre, released on 16 November 2018 by Columbia Records. It is the sequel to his fourth studio release, Équinoxe (1978), released forty years prior.

Recording 
Jarre for this album used both analog and digital instruments. At first he was going to use the analog instruments that he used in Équinoxe, but then he refused "because if I was once again the young guy I was when i Began that LP 40 years ago, I would use the instruments available today." Among the instruments he used was the prototype of a small synthesizer that Jarre discovered on Kickstarter called the granular GR-1 made by the company Tasty Chips Electronics. This instrument was used to process a child's voice giving him a surreal and technological look on the track "If the Wind Could Speak (movement 5)". Jarre explained that he intentionally shortened it to make a link to "Band In The Rain" (from Équinoxe Part 8) from the 1978 album.

Artwork 
Jean-Michel asked an artist from Prague named Filip Hodas to make two covers based on Michel Granger's design, Le trac for the original álbum, one in green and blue to symbolize a peaceful and harmonious future, and another that reflects a more apocalyptic and dystopian world. "The album is the soundtrack to both these futures, with some parts sounding more uplifting and poppy and others more dark."

Critical reception 

Aaron Badgley of Spill Magazine wrote that "Jarre does on this record that makes it so great, is develop a somewhat retro sound. This is electronic music from the '70s, with a bit of today's technology thrown in for good measure, and it adds to the album overall."

Track listing

Personnel
Personnel specified in the album notes:
 Jean-Michel Jarre – publication, composition, production and mixing
 Stephane Gervais – production assistance
 Patrick Pelamourgues – technical assistance
 David Perreau – mastering
 Filip Hodas – artwork (based in original by Michel Granger)
 Peter Lindbergh – portrait
 Eric BDFCK Cornic – graphic design

Equipment 
Adapted from liner notes:

 Yamaha CS-80
 ARP 2600 
 EMS VCS 3, EMS Synthi AKS 
 Eminent 310 Unique 
 Roland Paraphonic 505
 Minipops 
 Mellotron
 Korg PA-600
 Korg Polyphonic Ensemble P
 Korg MS-20, GRI
 Erica Synths Modular System 
 OPI 
 Modular Roland System 500 1 & 8
 Roland Boutiques
 Clavia Nord Lead 2
 Clavia Nord Modular 
 Small Stone
 Electric Mistress
 Big Sky & Capistan 
 Moog Sub 37
 Moog Taurus 1
 Animoog 
 Arturia Arp 2600 
 Arturia CS80 
 Spectrasonics Omnisphere
 NI Kontakt
 NI Reaktor
 Synapse Dune 2
 Synapse The Legend
 Spitfire Boom
 NI Replica XT
 u-he Satin
 ValhallaDSP
 Digisequencer

Charts

References

2018 albums
Jean-Michel Jarre albums
Sequel albums